English Rebel Songs 1381–1984 is the third studio album by English band Chumbawamba. It was originally released in 1988 with a slightly different track list under the title English Rebel Songs 1381–1914, then re-recorded in 2003. Composed mostly of traditional English protest songs, the recording was a stark contrast to the group's previous punk recordings, pointing towards their future integration of choral and a cappella music, as well as a greater focus on harmony in their musical sound. The 2003 recording added some light instrumentation on some tracks.

Some of the songs come from Stand Together by Hackney and Islington music group, 100 Songs Of Toil by Karl Dallas, A Touch On The Times, and A Ballad History of England by Roy Palmer. Many of the songs are still performed by modern English folk bands such as The Houghton Weavers and Coope, Boyes & Simpson.

The original LP recording (1988) was released on CD in 1994 by One Little Indian Records. Chumbawamba re-recorded the album (and modified the title) in 2003, adding two extra tracks, releasing it under their newly formed MUTT Records label.

Reception 
Allmusic called the album "eloquent", with "utterly relevant" songs, emphasizing that the singing in the 1988 version "was far better than anyone expected", and commending the improved technical quality of the 2003 recording, while  The Independent praised the album as having "rousing" songs, with "excellent" vocal performances, but expressed concern that there were no songs from later than 1984.

Track listing (2003 version) 

From the 2003 re-release: "Now, fifteen years later, we felt we'd learned enough about our voices to try again, updating and rearranging the songs against a backdrop of US/British warmongering. The songs were discovered in songbooks and in folk clubs and on cassette tapes, chopped and changed and bludgeoned into shape with utmost respect for the original tunes."

Track listing (1988/1994 versions) 
 "The Cutty Wren (Part 1)"
 "The Diggers Song"
 "Colliers March"
 "The Triumph of General Ludd"
 "Chartist Anthem"
 "Song on the Times"
 "Smashing of the Van"
 "The World Turned Upside Down"
 "Poverty Knock"
 "Idris Strike Song"
 "Hanging on the Old Barbed Wire"
 "The Cutty Wren (Part 2)"

According to the 1994 CD notes: "The words are sung, with a couple of  exceptions, exactly how we found them written.  To start chopping and changing them all to fit in with modern language and ideas would have destroyed the reason why we wanted to do them like this (Which isn't to say that folk music isn't to be changed, edited and modernised.) Consequently the language and meaning seem a bit peculiar at times."

Personnel 

2003 re-recording
 Lou Watts
 Harry Hamer
 Danbert Nobacon
 Jude Abbott
 Boff Whalley
 Neil Ferguson
 Simon "Commonknowledge" Lanzon

1988 recording
 Harry
 Simon Commonknowledge
 Lou
 Boff
 Mavis Dillon
 Cobie Laan
 Danbert Nobacon
 Alice Nutter was otherwise engaged
 Dunst was reading football fanzine

References

External links 

English Rebel Songs 1381–1984 at YouTube (streamed copy where licensed)

Chumbawamba albums
1988 albums
Agit-Prop Records albums
One Little Independent Records albums
A cappella albums